Daniel Fox (born 21 May 1994) is an Australian Paralympic swimmer. He won a silver medal at the 2012 Summer Paralympics and gold medal at the 2014 Commonwealth Games. He represented Australia  at the 2016 Rio Paralympics being awarded a bronze most recently in the 200m Freestyle S14. He has won gold at the Global Games, the Arafura Games, World Championships, Can-Am Championships, Para Pan Pacific Championships, EnergyAustralia Championships and the Commonwealth Games. Daniel also holds the world record for the 50m freestyle (24.77) and the 100m freestyle record (53.50)  in the S14 classification. Daniel Fox is also the Australian ambassador for the INAS Global Games in 2019.

Personal
He is actively involved in the local community often visiting his old High School Iona College with a goal to "inspire the younger generation and other kids with learning difficulties to do anything they put their mind to."

Swimming
Fox is an S14 classified swimmer. He trains at the Brisbane-based Chandler Swimming Centre with Coach Rob Hindmarsh  and is a member of the Chandler Swimming Club.

Fox started swimming when he was a toddler. He started competing in 2009 as an eighteen-year-old and made his national team debut that same year when he competed at the Global Games.  At that competition, he earned three gold and two silver medals. This was Daniel's first international meet where he showed potential and enjoyed the experience. Daniel competed in the  2010 World Championships in the men's 200m freestyle  event where he finished second. At the 2011 Arafura Games, he won four gold medals. He earned a bronze medal and three gold medals at the 2011 Can AM Championships in California. He competed in the 2012 Australian national championships. He was selected to represent Australia at the 2012 Summer Paralympics in swimming in the 200m freestyle and backstroke events.  At these games, Daniel swam at the Aquatics Centre placing fourth in the 100m backstroke and winning silver in the 200m Breastroke. This placing was incredibly close: finishing 0.13 seconds behind Iceland's Jon Margeir Sverrisson. These achievements were mores notable for a games with record number of participants (4237)  Going into the Rio Paralympic Games, Daniel was ranked third in the world and trained four hours a day in the pool.

Daniel has a long list of achievements, notably:-Competing at the 2013 IPC Swimming World Championships in Montreal, Quebec, Canada, Fox won the gold medal in the Men's 200 m Freestyle S14. 
-At the 2014 Commonwealth Games in Glasgow, Scotland he won the gold medal in the Men's 200 m Freestyle S14. In the heats, Fox broke the world record which he still holds.

-At the 2015 IPC Swimming World Championships, Glasgow, Scotland, he finished fourth in the Men's 200m Freestyle S14, eighth in the Men's 100m Backstroke S14 and sixteenth in the Men's 200m Individual Medley SM14.

-At the 2016 Rio Paralympics, he won the bronze medal in the Men's 200 m Freestyle S14. The leaders in this race were only separated by 0.37 seconds at the conclusion of the race. He also competed in Men's 100m Backstroke S14 finishing sixth and Men's 200m Individual Medley SM14 but didn't qualify for the final.

-In 2016, he is a Queensland Academy of Sport scholarship holder.

Professional results 

In reflection on preparing for Rio, Fox states "I have done the training and I feel ready to get back into the pool and in my crown back, I am focused on doing my best at Rio and I've got an extremely solid training schedule, early nights and very little socializing."

References

External links
 
 
 

Living people
Male Paralympic swimmers of Australia
Swimmers at the 2012 Summer Paralympics
Swimmers at the 2016 Summer Paralympics
Swimmers at the 2014 Commonwealth Games
Australian male freestyle swimmers
Australian male backstroke swimmers
1994 births
Paralympic silver medalists for Australia
Paralympic bronze medalists for Australia
Commonwealth Games gold medallists for Australia
Medalists at the 2012 Summer Paralympics
Medalists at the 2016 Summer Paralympics
S14-classified Paralympic swimmers
People from Redland City
Commonwealth Games medallists in swimming
Medalists at the World Para Swimming Championships
Paralympic medalists in swimming
21st-century Australian people
Medallists at the 2014 Commonwealth Games